Into the Mystery is the eighth studio album by American rock band Needtobreathe, released on July 30, 2021, through Elektra Records.

Background 
Following the 2020 release of their seventh studio album, Out of Body, and the early-2021 release of live album Live from the Woods Vol. 2, Needtobreathe announced the upcoming release of studio album Into the Mystery on April 26, 2021. After the band's tentative Out of Body Tour was cancelled due to the COVID-19 pandemic, Needtobreathe spent 21 days living together and recording Into the Mystery in Tennessee. The title track, "Into the Mystery" was released as the first single from the album on May 6, 2021. Subsequent singles released include "I Wanna Remember" (featuring Carrie Underwood), "What I'm Here For", "Sunshine", "Chances", and "Carry Me" (featuring Jon Foreman of Switchfoot). A film chronicling the album recording process was released via Greenwich Entertainment in theaters for a one-night-only event on November 3, 2021, though it was made available on-demand three weeks later on November 23, 2021.

Promotion 
Needtobreathe announced the Into the Mystery Tour along with the announcement of the upcoming album on April 26, 2021. The band revealed tour guests to be the New Respects and Switchfoot on April 29 and 30, 2021, respectively. The Into the Mystery Tour began in St. Louis, Missouri on September 7, 2021 and concluded in Atlanta, Georgia on October 30, 2021. Needtobreathe performed "I Wanna Remember" with Carrie Underwood at Bonnaroo Farm during the 2021 CMT Music Awards, which aired on CMT on June 9, 2021. The band later performed "Into the Mystery" on The Late Show with Stephen Colbert.

Track listing

Credits

Charts

References

2021 albums
Needtobreathe albums